"Chapter One: Make Your Mark" is the pilot episode of the HBO dark comedy Barry. It was directed by Bill Hader, who stars in the titular role, and co-written with Alec Berg. The episode establishes the plot of the series, about an Afghan war veteran turned hit man who decides to pursue an acting career after following a mark to acting class. It was released on March 25, 2018.

"Chapter One: Make Your Mark" received critical acclaim. For the episode, Bill Hader won a Directors Guild of America Award for Outstanding Directorial Achievement in Comedy Series.

Plot 
Barry Berkman (Bill Hader) is a Marine Corps veteran and a hitman based in Cleveland. Returning home after completing a job, Barry is approached by Fuches (Stephen Root), his handler and mentor. He gives Barry an assignment for the Chechen mob out in Los Angeles, hoping a change of scenery will cheer up the burnt-out Barry. Barry flies to Los Angeles and meets Chechen mob boss Goran Pazar (Glenn Fleshler) and his right-hand man NoHo Hank (Anthony Carrigan). The target is revealed to be Ryan Madison (Tyler Jacob Moore), a personal trainer whom Goran's wife is having an affair with.

Barry follows Ryan to a community center and waits outside. Moments later, Barry approaches the building and hears a woman yelling. He approaches her and discovers she is rehearsing lines from a script. She chastises him and runs into the building. Barry follows her and enters a theater where a man and the woman he just interrupted are on stage performing. The theater teacher, Gene M. Cousineau (Henry Winkler) insults Sally Reed (Sarah Goldberg), the female student, then encourages her to finish the scene, which she does with fervor. As Barry watches Sally, he is approached from behind by Ryan, who asks him to do a scene with him. They perform a scene from the movie True Romance, with Barry blankly reading his lines from the script.

After Cousineau dismisses the class, Sally invites Barry to join the students at a bar. At the bar, she and the acting students brainstorm a monologue Barry can prepare for class. As Sally and her classmates dance, Barry becomes infatuated with her from afar. Afterward, Barry drives an inebriated Ryan home, and he hugs Barry in response. Unbeknownst to Barry, NoHo Hank and his henchman are watching from afar. The next morning, Fuches tells Barry what NoHo Hank saw. Barry explains that he wants to pursue acting, but Fuches says that Barry must complete the job and forget acting.

At night, Barry approaches Cousineau outside the community center. Barry confesses he is a hitman and tells Cousineau that he is depressed about his life. However, Cousineau assumes that Barry was performing a monologue and tells him that he can be in the class. Barry tells Cousineau his last name is Block, an idea proposed by Ryan a day earlier. Barry then follows Ryan to his apartment and approaches Ryan's car preparing to kill him. However, Barry discovers that Ryan had already been shot dead, and discovers NoHo Hank and two henchmen in a car across the street. NoHo Hank orders a henchman to shoot Barry, but Barry retaliates by shooting at the three, killing the two henchmen while NoHo Hank escapes. As police rush to the scene, Barry hides in a nearby diner. Served by a waitress learning lines for an audition, Barry declares he, too, is an actor.

Cast

Main 
 Bill Hader as Barry Berkman/Barry Block
 Stephen Root as Monroe Fuches
 Sarah Goldberg as Sally Reed
 Glenn Fleshler as Goran Pazar
 Anthony Carrigan as NoHo Hank
 Henry Winkler as Gene Cousineau

Supporting 
 Darrell Britt-Gibson as Jermaine Jefrint
 D'Arcy Carden as Natalie Greer
 Andy Carey as Eric
 Rightor Doyle as Nick Nicholby
 Alejandro Furth as Antonio Manuel
 Kirby Howell-Baptiste as Sasha Smith

Guest 
 Tyler Jacob Moore as Richard Krempf/Ryan Madison
 Melissa Villaseñor as Diner Waitress

Production 
In 2014, Hader signed a development deal with HBO and approached co-show runner Alec Berg to help him develop a television series. Barry is Hader's first directing project and first major project after leaving Saturday Night Live. He also stars as Barry.

Release 
The episode was released on HBO on March 25, 2018.

Critical reception 
The episode received critical acclaim. Charles Bramesco gave the episode 5/5 stars in a review for Vulture. Of Bill Hader's acting in the pilot, Vikram Murthi wrote for The A.V. Club, "Hader’s restrained portrait of depression elevates the winning material in interesting ways, especially in the acting scenes.. Barry might have spoken his lines in a rushed, monotone voice, but the polite applause, though directed at Ryan, was enough for him to catch the bug."

Awards 
The episode was nominated for two Primetime Emmy Awards in the Outstanding Directing for a Comedy Series and Outstanding Writing for a Comedy Series. The Writers Guild of America nominated Bill Hader and Alec Berg in the Television: Episodic Comedy category.

Bill Hader won a Directors Guild of America Award for Outstanding Directorial Achievement in Comedy Series.

References

External links 
"Chapter One: Make Your Mark" on HBO

Barry (TV series) episodes
American television series premieres
2018 American television episodes
Television episodes directed by Bill Hader
Television episodes written by Bill Hader